Andromeda X (And 10) is a dwarf spheroidal galaxy about 2.9 million light-years away from the Sun in the constellation Andromeda.  Discovered in 2005 by Zucker et al., And X is a satellite galaxy of the Andromeda Galaxy (M31). Aided by the application of stellar photometry to data from the Sloan Digital Sky Survey similar to the Andromeda IX discovery, the new finding indicates that this type of extremely faint satellite might be common in the Local Group, potentially providing further support for hierarchical cold dark matter models.

See also

 List of Andromeda's satellite galaxies

References

External links
 SEDS webpage for Andromeda X
 Andromeda X: Andromeda's Newest Satellite Galaxy

Dwarf spheroidal galaxies
5056921
Local Group
Andromeda Subgroup
Andromeda (constellation)